Give It to Me is the third single from Mobb Deep's debut album with G-Unit Records, Blood Money. The song features Young Buck and is produced by Profile. It samples Kuch Kuch Hota Hai.

Music video
In the music video directed by Jessy Terrero it features various cameo appearances by G-Unit members including Spider Loc, 50 Cent, Lloyd Banks, Hot Rod and Tony Yayo.

References  

Mobb Deep songs
Young Buck songs
2006 songs
Interscope Records singles
G-Unit Records singles
Songs written by Prodigy (rapper)
Songs written by Havoc (musician)
Songs written by Young Buck
Songs written by 50 Cent
Songs with music by Jatin–Lalit